Vera Zvonareva was the defending champion, but chose not to participate this year.

Jelena Janković won the title, defeating Maria Sharapova in the final 4–6, 6–3, 7–5.

Seeds 
A champion seed is indicated in bold text while text in italics indicates the round in which that seed was eliminated. The top eight seeds received a bye to the second round.

Draw

Finals

Top half

Section 1

Section 2

Bottom half

Section 3

Section 4

References
2007 DFS Classic Draw (Archived 2009-05-16)

DFS Classic Singles
Singles

fr:Classic de Birmingham 2007
pl:DFS Classic 2007
sk:DFS Classic 2007